K Street is a major thoroughfare in the United States capital of Washington, D.C., known as a center for numerous lobbyists and advocacy groups.

Location

In the Washington D.C. street grid there are three (3) unconnected east-to-west street segments designated as K Street NW / NE, and also a southern K Street.

The middle segment of K Street NW / NE, which carries a segment of U.S. Route 29, begins in the city's Northwest quadrant as K Street NW, just west of the abutment of the old Aqueduct Bridge on the Georgetown waterfront.  The street travels east underneath the Whitehurst Freeway, crosses Rock Creek on the K Street Bridge, and continues through downtown D.C.  After its intersection with North Capitol Street, the street's designation changes  to K Street NE as it enters the Northeast quadrant. The street ends at Florida Avenue in the Near Northeast neighborhood, just south of Gallaudet University. 

K Street NE briefly reappears further east in the Carver neighborhood, extending from Blandensburg Road for six blocks to Maryland Avenue NE.

The westernmost (Georgetown) segment of K street NW was known as Water Street prior to the Georgetown street renaming of 1895. West of 33rd Street NW, the United States Postal Service still recognizes both "K Street" and "Water Street" in addresses.  The westernmost end of K Street occupies the former right of way of the Georgetown Branch of the Baltimore and Ohio Railroad.  When that line was abandoned, K Street was extended west to the Washington Canoe Club.  The rest of the Georgetown right of way is now occupied by the Capital Crescent Trail, which begins at the terminus of K Street.

The southern K Street runs between the Potomac and Anacostia rivers, crossing the Southwest and Southeast quadrants (as K Street SW and K Street SE, respectively).

Traffic configuration

Current

K Street provides a major east-west thoroughfare for traffic through Washington, primarily from Mount Vernon Square to the Whitehurst Freeway. The street continues through Georgetown under the Whitehurst Freeway; however most westbound traffic exits to the freeway. A portion of the street travels in a tunnel underneath Washington Circle, allowing through traffic to avoid the circle. Portions of the street are divided into both "local" (or service) lanes and "express" lanes in both directions.

Proposed
The Washington Metropolitan Area Transit Authority has been studying the conversion of K Street into part of a proposed busway. The route would begin at Georgetown University, cross downtown Washington on K Street, switch to Massachusetts Avenue at Mount Vernon Square, and end at Union Station. Currently, the DC Circulator provides service along most of the proposed route, although it must share right of way with other vehicles.

A streetcar line spanning from 26th Street NW to the H Street line's terminus at Union Station is planned as the next phase of DC's streetcar expansion.

A proposal announced April 7, 2022, would redesign K Street between 12th and 21st Streets, N.W. The proposal would remove the service lanes in favor of dedicated bus and bicycle lanes. Under the proposal, construction would begin in the spring of 2023.

Lobbying
"K Street" is the common and often negative metonym for Washington's lobbying industry. Many of the major Washington lobbying firms were located on the section in Northwest Washington which passes from Georgetown through a portion of downtown D.C., although the strip has grown less popular for lobbyists in recent years. The major lobbying firms that remain on K Street, as of 2017, include CGCN Group and K&L Gates.

The 2003 HBO television series K Street about a lobbying firm takes its name and location from the street.

See also
 Lobbying in the United States
 Tufton Street - a similar location in London hosting think-tanks and lobbyists

References

External links

K Street Busway project leaflet
"The Road to Riches Is Called K Street"

Streets in Washington, D.C.
U.S. Route 29